Acrocercops ophiodes is a moth of the family Gracillariidae. It is known from Queensland and New South Wales, Australia.

References

ophiodes
Moths of Australia
Moths described in 1896